Marc Restout (14 February 1616, in Caen – 3 April 1684, in Caen) was a French painter. The son of Marguerin Restout, he belonged to the famous Restout dynasty of painters. He was a prolific painter and won a major reputation in Flanders, Holland and Rome, having accompanied Poussin to Rome in 1642. By his death he was an échevin in Caen.

He had ten children, most of whom became painters, including Jacques Restout, Eustache Restout, Jean I Restout, Charles Restout, Thomas Restout, Pierre Restout and Marc Antoine Restout.

1616 births
1684 deaths
17th-century French painters
French male painters
Mayors of Caen